Francesco Rizzo (30 May 1943 – 17 July 2022) was an Italian footballer who played as a midfielder.

Club career
Born in Rovito, in the province of Cosenza, Rizzo began playing football with Cosenza. After spells with Milan and Alessandria, he joined Cagliari where he made his Serie A debut against Fiorentina on 29 November 1964.

During his club career he played for Cosenza, Alessandria, Cagliari, Fiorentina, Bologna, Catanzaro, Cesena and Genoa.

International career
At international level, Rizzo earned two caps and scored two goals for the Italy national team in 1966, and was part of the Italian squad for the 1966 FIFA World Cup.

References

External links
  Profile at enciclopediadelcalcio.it
  Profile at FIGC
 

1943 births
2022 deaths
Italian footballers
Association football midfielders
Italy international footballers
1966 FIFA World Cup players
Serie A players
Cosenza Calcio players
U.S. Alessandria Calcio 1912 players
Cagliari Calcio players
ACF Fiorentina players
Bologna F.C. 1909 players
U.S. Catanzaro 1929 players
A.C. Cesena players
Genoa C.F.C. players
Sportspeople from the Province of Cosenza